The 1953 Yugoslav Women's Basketball League is the 9th season of the Yugoslav Women's Basketball League, the highest professional basketball league in Yugoslavia for women's. Championships is played in 1953 and played four teams. Champion for this season is Crvena zvezda.

Table

External links
 History of league

Yugoslav Women's Basketball League seasons
Women
1953 in women's basketball
basketball